Robert Barry Dickey (November 10, 1811 – July 14, 1903) was a participant in the conferences leading to the Canadian Confederation of 1867 and is therefore considered to be one of the Fathers of Confederation.

Born in Amherst, the son of Robert McGowan Dickey and Eleanor Chapman, he was educated at Windsor Academy and later studied law with Alexander Stewart.  He was called to the Nova Scotia bar in 1834, and to the New Brunswick bar in 1835. He was made a Queen's Counsel in 1863.  He served as both judge and registrar of probate in Cumberland County for 20 years. In 1844, he married Mary Blair, one of Alexander Stewart's daughters. Dickey was a director of the Nova Scotia Electric Telegraph Company and consular agent for the United States at Amherst.

From 1858 to 1867, Dickey was appointed to the Legislative Council of Nova Scotia.  In 1867, he was appointed to the Senate of Canada representing the senatorial division of Amherst, Nova Scotia. A Conservative, he served until his death in 1903.

His son Arthur Rupert Dickey served as a member of the House of Commons.

His daughter Mary married the English landscape architect Henry Ernest Milner.

References

External links
Library and Archives Canada Profile
 

1811 births
1903 deaths
Canadian Presbyterians
Canadian senators from Nova Scotia
Fathers of Confederation
Conservative Party of Canada (1867–1942) senators
Members of the Legislative Council of Nova Scotia
People from Amherst, Nova Scotia
Colony of Nova Scotia judges
Persons of National Historic Significance (Canada)
Canadian King's Counsel
19th-century King's Counsel